The Schellingstraße is a 1.9 km long street in the Maxvorstadt in Munich.

History 
The traditional restaurants in the streets were visited by Bertolt Brecht, Wassily Kandinsky, Rainer Maria Rilke, Lenin, Franz Josef Strauß (Schelling-Salon) and Thomas Mann, Frank Wedekind, Joachim Ringelnatz, Stefan George, Franz Marc, Paul Klee, Vladimir Lenin (Café Altschwabing).

References

External links

Streets in Munich
Maxvorstadt